Brook Green is a small hamlet on the Isle of Wight located at Brook on the Back of the Wight. It is owned by the National Trust.

References 

Villages on the Isle of Wight
National Trust properties on the Isle of Wight
Brighstone